Vladimir Kazantsev may refer to:

Vladimir Kazantsev (athlete) (1923–2007), Soviet athlete
Vladimir Kazantsev (canoeist) (born 1972), Uzbekistani sprint canoer